USS Watonwan (ID-4296) was a United States Navy cargo ship in commission in 1919.

Watonwan was a steel-hulled, single-screw freighter built for the United States Shipping Board in 1918 at Bristol, Pennsylvania, by the Merchant Shipbuilding Corporation. In 1919 she was taken over by the U.S. Navy for operation by the Naval Overseas Transportation Service (NOTS). Assigned Identification Number (Id. No.) 4296, she was placed in commission at Philadelphia, Pennsylvania, on 4 February 1919.

After loading 7,087 tons of flour, Watonwan departed Philadelphia on 19 February 1919, bound for the British Isles, and arrived in Falmouth, England, on 5 March 1919. After discharging a part of her cargo there, she departed Falmouth on 12 March 1919 and called at Plymouth, England, and Gibraltar before departing Gibraltar on 22 March 1919 for Italy. Reaching Genoa on 26 March 1919, she discharged the last of her cargo of flour there, loaded 1,250 tons of stone ballast, and sailed via Gibraltar for the United States.

Watonwan tarried briefly at Norfolk, Virginia, arriving on 26 April 1919 and departing on 27 April 1919, before moving on to New Orleans, Louisiana. She arrived there on 8 May 1919 and was decommissioned on 14 May 1919. She was simultaneously struck from the Navy List and returned to the Shipping Board. Laid up in 1923, Watonwan was broken up in 1930.

References

External links
 Photo gallery at navsource.org

Design 1025 ships of the United States Navy
Ships built in Pennsylvania
1918 ships
World War I cargo ships of the United States
World War I auxiliary ships of the United States
Design 1025 ships